Crusader, in full "Tank, Cruiser Mk VI, Crusader", also known by its General Staff number  A.15, was one of the primary British cruiser tanks during the early part of the Second World War. Over 5,000 tanks were manufactured and they made important contributions to the British victories during the North African campaign. The Crusader tank would not see active service beyond Africa but the chassis of the tank was modified to create anti-aircraft, fire support, observation, communication, bulldozer and recovery vehicle variants.

The first Crusader Mark I tanks entered service in 1941 and though manoeuvrable, they were relatively lightly armoured and under-armed. The main armament for the Crusader Mark I and IIs was a 40 mm Ordnance QF 2-pounder gun; the following Crusader Mark III was fitted with a 57 mm Ordnance QF 6-pounder gun at the expense of one member of the crew in the turret. This variant was more than a match for the mid-generation German Panzer III and Panzer IV medium tanks that it faced in combat. As part of the 1st Armoured Brigade, the Crusader was to prove vital during the Second Battle of El Alamein, at the siege of Tobruk and in the Tunisia campaign.

Retained in service because of delays with its replacement, by late 1942, the lack of armament upgrades, plus reliability problems due to the harsh desert conditions and the appearance of Tiger I heavy tanks in the German Afrika Korps, saw the Crusader replaced as the main tank by US-supplied M3 Grant and then by the M4 Sherman medium tanks but it was retained in combat use until the end of the war in North Africa and after that for training in Britain.

Design and development
In 1938, Nuffield Mechanizations and Aero Limited produced their A16 design for a heavy cruiser tank based on Christie suspension. Looking for a lighter and cheaper tank to build, the General Staff requested alternatives from British industry. To this end, the A13 Mk III cruiser tank, which would enter service as the "Tank, Cruiser Mk V" (and known in service as "Covenanter"), was designed by LMS. Nuffield was, in 1939, offered the opportunity to take part in the production of the Covenanter.

Nuffield, however, preferred to work on its own version of the A13—though it still provided design work for the Covenanter's turret. This new tank was adopted as "Tank, Cruiser, Mk VI Crusader", under General Staff specification A15. Although Crusader is often referred to as an improved version of the Covenanter, in fact it was a parallel design. Both tanks were ordered "off the drawing board" without building prototypes first. Despite a later start, the pilot model of the Crusader was ready six weeks before the first Covenanter.

Unlike earlier "Christie cruisers" (A13, Marks III and IV and the Mark V Covenanter) that were built with four road wheels, Crusader had five road wheels each side to improve weight distribution in a tank that weighed almost 20 tons instead of the 14 tons of the previous cruisers. The -diameter wheels were of pressed steel with solid rubber tyres. The hull sides were built up of two separated plates, with the suspension arms between them.

It had a different engine from the Covenanter, different steering system and a conventional cooling system with radiators in the engine compartment. Covenanter used a brand new engine design, whereas Crusader adapted the readily available Liberty engine to fit into a lower profile engine compartment. At the left side of the front hull—a place occupied by the engine radiator in the Covenanter—was mounted a small hand-traversed auxiliary turret armed with a Besa machine gun. The auxiliary turret was awkward to use and was often removed in the field or remained unoccupied.

Both the A13 Mk III Covenanter and the A15 Crusader designs used the same main turret. The turret was polygonal—with sides that sloped out then in again—to give maximum space on the limited turret ring diameter. Early production vehicles had a "semi-internal" cast gun mantlet, which was quickly replaced in production by a better protected larger cast mantlet with three vertical slits for the main gun, a coaxial Besa machine gun and for the sighting telescope. There was no cupola for the commander who instead had a flat hatch with the periscope mounted through it.

The main armament, as in other British tanks of the period, was balanced so that the gunner could control its elevation through a padded shaft against his right shoulder rather than using a geared mechanism. This fitted well with the British doctrine of firing accurately on the move.

When it was understood that there would be delays in the introduction of successor heavy cruiser tanks (the Cavalier, Centaur and Cromwell), the Crusader was adapted with a six-pounder gun.

Performance
Initial performance of the Crusader was found to be better than the comparable Stuart light tanks. Despite reliability problems, the tanks formed the primary unit for British cruiser tank armoured regiments, while the Stuart was used for reconnaissance.

The Crusader suffered from chronic reliability problems in desert use as a result of several factors. Tanks arriving in North Africa were missing many of the essential tools and servicing manuals needed to maintain operation—stolen or lost in transit. As tanks broke down, a lack of spare parts meant that many components were replaced with worn parts recovered from other tanks. When the tanks were returned to the base workshops upon reaching service intervals, many were serviced with components that had already achieved their design lifespan.

A rapid ramp-up in manufacturing within the UK caused quality issues as inexperienced workers began assembling tanks. This placed further pressure on the receiving base workshops who had to carry out the necessary re-work.

The new tanks also had a number of design flaws which needed to be worked out. The reconfiguration of the Mk. III Liberty engine into a flatter format to fit into the Crusader engine compartment had badly affected the tank's water pumps and cooling fan arrangements, both of which were critical in the hot desert temperatures. Several official and unofficial in-theatre modifications were applied in attempts to improve reliability and conserve water, which otherwise had to be prioritised on keeping the vehicles running. Rectification of these issues took a very long time, by which time confidence in the Crusader had been lost. Calls were made at various points for the vehicles to be replaced with the Valentine infantry tank or US-made M3 Grant tank.

As time moved on, more and more were being returned to base workshops, leading to a shortage of battle-ready tanks and a massive backlog of repair works to be completed. The number of vehicles available on the frontline dwindled, and US-made replacements were brought in.

While the 2-pounder gun had good performance when the tank was introduced, ammunition supply was focused on solid armour-piercing (AP) rounds. When German tanks moved to face-hardened armour, an effective Armour-piercing, Capped, Ballistic Capped (APCBC) ammunition was not available. By the time it was, German tanks had adapted specifically to counter it. Delays in producing the next generation of cruiser tanks meant the Crusader was later up-armed with the 6-pounder, which had much better anti-tank performance.

In keeping with a highly mobile cruiser tank, the vehicle had lighter armour than the Axis tanks that it encountered. It was among the first to have additional armour fitted to the ammunition storage. This greatly improved vehicle survivability with only a slight reduction in the number of rounds that could be carried. A significant area of concern, however, was the driver's compartment, the side of which had been left exposed by the removal of the secondary Besa machine gun turret. The angle left behind became a shot trap, with some incoming shells being deflected into the tank.

Despite the many problems, the Crusader was successful in combat against Axis tanks, using its better mobility and greater capability to fire on the move to strike at vehicle weak spots. This caused a change in German tactics, whereby Axis tanks would feign retreat, drawing Crusader units onto a pre-positioned anti-tank gun screen. With no high explosive (HE) ammunition, the Crusader struggled to engage these emplaced enemies. This situation continued until the introduction of US-produced vehicles, such as the Grant and then the Sherman, with dual-purpose 75 mm guns.

Service history

North Africa
With the Axis forces in North Africa having pushed the British back to the Egyptian border and the remaining British armour being a mixed force of older tanks with a few Matilda infantry tanks, tanks were hurriedly shipped via the Mediterranean arriving on 12 May 1941. There were sufficient Crusaders to equip the 6th Royal Tank Regiment (6RTR) which with the older cruiser tanks of  2nd Royal Tank Regiment (2RTR) formed the 7th Armoured Brigade. The rest of the tanks were Matildas for the 4th Armoured Brigade giving the 7th Armoured Division only four tank regiments.

Although there was pressure from London for the 7th Armoured Division to go into action, outfitting for the desert and training delayed the first use of Crusaders until Operation Battleaxe, an attempt to relieve the siege of Tobruk in June. As the brigade swept round the flank, the Crusaders were caught by concealed anti-tank guns and lost 11 tanks. The 6 RTR lost further tanks to action and defects in the fighting withdrawal during the next two days.

The 7th Armoured Brigade was re-equipped with further Crusaders, but, as the brigade had been expanded by the addition of 7th Hussars, there were not sufficient Crusaders to replace the older cruiser tanks.

The 22nd Armoured Brigade comprising three inexperienced armoured regiments equipped with Crusaders, transferred to North Africa to bring the 7th Armoured up to a strength of three armoured brigades. The 8th Hussars was added to the 4th Armoured Brigade, but these had to be equipped with M3 Stuart light tanks as there were still insufficient cruisers. The 22nd was able to take part in Operation Crusader in November 1941.

In Operation Crusader, the two British corps were disposed such that they could not support each other, but it was expected that, as the British outnumbered the German and Italian forces in tanks, the tank against tank battles would be decided in their favour. However, in the resulting encounters, Rommel did not put his tanks en masse into action against the British ones, and the large numbers of German anti-tank (AT) guns working offensively with the tanks and infantry proved effective. This superiority in quality and tactical deployment of anti-tank guns was to be a feature of the Afrika Korps throughout the "Desert War". The Crusader's 2-pounder (40 mm) gun was as effective as the short-barrelled 50 mm of the Panzer III, although it was out-ranged by the short-barrelled 75 mm of the Panzer IV.

Although the Crusader was faster than any tanks it opposed, its potential was limited by a relatively light QF 2-pounder gun, thin armour, and mechanical problems. A particular tactical limitation was the lack of a high-explosive shell for the main armament (these existed but were never supplied). Axis tank forces developed an extremely effective method of dealing with attacking tank forces by retiring behind a screen of concealed anti-tank guns. The pursuing tanks could then be engaged by the artillery. With the German anti-tank guns out of range of the tanks' machine guns and without a high-explosive shell to return fire, the tanks were left with the equally unpalatable options of withdrawing under fire or trying to overrun the gun screen.

The Crusader proved prone to "brew up" when hit, a problem that was identified as being due to the ammunition being ignited by hot metal penetrating the unprotected racks. The angled underside of the turret created shot traps that deflected rounds downward, through the hull roof.

The Crusader proved unreliable in the desert. This started with their transport from the UK to North Africa. Poor preparation and handling caused problems that had to be rectified before they could be passed to the regiments and ate into the supply of spare parts. Once in use, the sand caused erosion in the cooling system and the stresses of hard cross-country travel caused oil leaks between the engine block and the cylinders. Since there were few tank transporters or railways in the desert, the tanks had to travel long distances on their tracks, causing further wear.

By the end of 1941, there was only one brigade, the 2nd, which was operating with only Crusaders. In March 1942, US-built Grant medium tanks arrived and replaced one in three Crusader squadrons. While the inclusion of Grants with its effective 75 mm gun gave better firepower against anti-tank guns and infantry, had better armour, and were more mechanically reliable, they were slower, limiting the Crusaders when they had to operate together. From May 1942, Mk IIIs (with the 57 mm 6-pounder gun) were delivered. Of the 840 tanks available to the British, 260 were Crusaders. The German tanks they were facing were improved types with face-hardened frontal armour, which caused 2-pounder shot to shatter rather than penetrate.

As part of British deception operations, Crusaders could be issued with "Sunshade", which was a metal framework with canvas covering that disguised the tank as a lorry to German aerial reconnaissance. Dummy tanks were also deployed.

Later in the campaign, shipping was improved, Nuffield put an engineering team in Egypt, and crews were better at preventing problems, but the reputation of the Crusader could not recover.

After Montgomery took over command, the imbalance between British and German armour was redressed by better control and the addition of more American-supplied Grant and Sherman tanks. The Crusader was replaced in the main line of battle and used for "light squadrons" trying to flank the enemy when it engaged the heavier units. The Australian 9th Infantry Division operated Crusaders for reconnaissance and liaison.

The British 1st Army landed as part of the Allied operations in Tunisia; some of its units were using the Crusader and these saw action from 24 November. These were not solely Crusader regiments, but mixed Crusader and Valentine tanks; within each squadron, two troops were Crusader IIIs, and there were Crusader II CSs attached to the Squadron HQ. These units of the 26th Armoured Brigade were used as an independent armoured column, "Blade Force", with the 78th Infantry Division. The operations of Blade Force were on terrain different from the desert of the earlier campaigns, and the fighting took place with smaller numbers of vehicles. These actions were similar to what would be seen later in Europe.

The 1st Army converted to Shermans during the Tunisia campaign, but Crusaders remained in use with the 8th for longer. The last major actions for Crusaders were the Battle of the Mareth Line and the Battle of Wadi Akarit. The North Africa campaign finished shortly after.

Other use

After the completion of the North African Campaign, the availability of better tanks, such as the Sherman and Cromwell, relegated the Crusader to secondary duties, such as anti-aircraft mounts or gun tractors. In these roles, it served for the remainder of the war. The Crusader, along with the Covenanter, equipped regiments at home; particularly those of the 11th Armoured Division. A Crusader bulldozer was developed, but not used operationally. One of these bulldozer tanks was converted for removing munitions following a fire at Royal Ordnance Factory Kirkby. The Crusader anti-aircraft guns were designed for use in North West Europe but given Allied air supremacy, the AA troops were disbanded.

The Crusader gun tractors operated with 76.2 mm Ordnance QF 17-pounder 17-pounder anti-tank gun regiments attached to armoured divisions and with XII Corps. The turret of a Crusader tank was used by the French Far East Expeditionary Corps to defend the city of Hanoi at the beginning of the first Indochina War.

Variants

Crusader I (Cruiser Mk VI)
Original production version. The auxiliary turret was often removed in the field, eliminating the hull machine gunner position.
 Crusader I CS (Cruiser Mk VI CS) (Close Support) mounted a Ordnance QF 3 inch howitzer (76.2 mm) in the turret instead of the 2-pounder.

Crusader II (Cruiser Mk VIA)
The Crusader II had increased armour on hull front and turret front. As with the Mk I, the auxiliary turret was often removed.
 Crusader II CS (Cruiser Mk VIA CS) mounted a 3-inch (76.2 mm) howitzer in the turret.
 Command tank version existed with dummy gun and two No. 19 radios.

Crusader III
Due to delays with the Cruiser Mark VII Cavalier and the need for cruiser tanks, the Crusader was up-gunned with the 57 mm 6-pounder, the first British tank to mount this gun. Design work for a new turret started in March 1941, but Nuffield was not involved until late in the year, when they adapted the existing turret with a new mantlet and hatch.

The turret also received an extractor fan to clear fumes from the firing of the gun. The larger gun restricted turret space, so the crew was reduced to three, with the commander also acting as gun loader, a role previously performed by the wireless operator. The auxiliary turret space was given over to ammunition stowage.

Crusader III also saw the introduction of the Mk. IV Liberty engine, fixing many of the reliability issues previously encountered. This featured the Mk. III engine's later updated water pumps along with a shaft drive replacing chain drive for the cooling fans.

Production started in May 1942 and 144 were complete by July. The Crusader III first saw action, with about 100 participating, at the Second Battle of El Alamein in October 1942.

Observation post
This was a tank converted to a mobile armoured observation post for direction of artillery. The turret was fixed in place, the gun was removed and a dummy barrel fitted to give it the same outward appearance of a regular tank. With no requirement for ammunition, the interior was given over to the radios, two No. 19 radios and No. 18 radio, map boards and related equipment. The Royal Artillery could then operate the OP tank up front among the fighting units directing artillery fire in their support.

Crusader III, AA Mk I
The 6-pounder was replaced with a Bofors 40 mm anti-aircraft gun with an autoloader and powered mounting in an open-topped turret. The crew numbered four: gun commander, gun layer, loader, and driver. However, those Crusader III, AA Mk I used in NW Europe from D-day on did not have the turret, but a 40 mm Bofors gun mounted directly on the hull top with its standard shield.

Crusader III, AA Mk II / Mk III
A Crusader armed with twin Oerlikon 20 mm guns for anti-aircraft use and a single .303 (7.7 mm) Vickers GO machine gun. The turret was a small polygonal turret with heavy armour, but poor situational visibility for spotting approaching aircraft. The Mk III only differed from the Mk II by the position of the radio, which was moved to the hull in order to free some space inside the turret.

A variation with triple Oerlikons was produced in very limited quantities but seem to have been used only for training.

Due to Allied air superiority over the battlefields of north-west Europe, none of the AA versions saw much action against aircraft but a few - especially with the 1st Polish Armoured Division - were used against ground targets. The AA troops - attached to HQ squadrons - were disbanded after the Normandy landings.

Crusader II, Gun Tractor Mk I
The Crusader gun tractor came out of a need for a vehicle to tow the heavy 76.2 mm QF 17 pounder anti-tank gun. It was a Crusader tank hull with a simple boxy superstructure replacing that of the gun tank. The 14 mm thick structure protected the driver and the gun crew of six. The tractor also carried ammunition on the rear and within the crew area.

This was still hard on the towed 17 pounder guns. They were used in northwest Europe from the Normandy landings of 1944 to the end of the war in 1945.

One such unit was the 86th Anti-Tank Gun Regiment, Royal Artillery, part of XII Corps. In the 86th, the Crusader gun tractor replaced earlier Morris C8 gun tractors in two out of the four batteries. Unit veterans reported that the Crusader was popular with the crews and were often driven by former Armoured Corps drivers seconded to the Royal Artillery because of their driving experience. 86th veterans claimed that they removed the 'governors' that normally limited tank speeds.

Some vehicles were also used by battery commanders as armoured command and reconnaissance vehicles.

Crusader ARV Mk I
Armoured recovery vehicle based on turretless Crusader hull. One prototype was built in 1942.

Crusader self-propelled guns
 A post-war modification was built, probably for testing purposes only, with a 5.5-inch (140 mm) Medium Gun installed at the front of the vehicle, facing back.
 Some Crusader gun tractors sold after the war to Argentina were converted to self-propelled guns, with French 75 mm or 105 mm gun installed in a large, boxy superstructure.

Additional variants
 Crusader with Anti-Mine Roller Attachment (AMRA) Mk Id: a mine clearing device consisting of four heavy rollers suspended from a frame. Weight of the rollers could be increased by filling them with water, sand etc.

Crusaders were used for experimentation such as a flotation kit, consisting of two pontoons attached to hull sides, special blades attached to tracks to propel the vehicle in water and a cowl over engine air intakes and cooling louvres.

Operators
  – converted gun tractors
 
 one squadron of the 9th Division Cavalry Regiment; North Africa (1941–43)
 at least one Crusader was trialled in Australia (1941) by the 1st Armoured Division
 
  - 2 Battalions - around 60 Tanks of the Egyptian Army Cavalry and Armoured Corps used it till the early 1960s. Along with 1 Battalion of Crusader AA as Anti-Aircraft Artillery from 1944 till the late 1960s. Saw action in the Suez War in Anti-aircraft role.
 
  – Captured vehicles used in the 15th Panzer Division. Designated Kreuzer Panzerkampfwagen Mk VI 746 (e).
  – captured vehicles used in the 133rd Littorio Armoured Division.
 
  – Used by the 1st Armoured Division

Surviving vehicles

Around 21 tanks survive in various degrees of preservation, ranging from running-condition museum vehicles to wrecks. Eight survive in various collections in South Africa.

Notable examples include the Crusader III in running condition at The Tank Museum in the United Kingdom. The Musée des Blindés in France preserves a Mk III anti-aircraft Crusader and the Overloon War Museum in the Netherlands owns a gun-tractor variant.

Notes

References

Sources

External links

 OnWar Mk I, Mk II, Mk III
 WWII vehicles
 Crusader MkII photo gallery at svsm.org 

Armoured fighting vehicles of Argentina
Cruiser tanks of the United Kingdom
Multi-turreted tanks
World War II tanks of the United Kingdom
Military vehicles introduced from 1940 to 1944